The Government of the Czech Republic since January 9, 2007 was formed by a coalition of the victorious Civic Democratic Party (ODS, 9 seats) with the small Christian and Democratic Union - Czechoslovak People's Party (KDU-ČSL, 5 seats) and the Green Party (SZ, 4 seats). It had 18 members; initially four of the appointed ministers were women but two subsequently resigned and were replaced with men. On 24 March 2009, during the Czech presidency of the European Union, Topolánek's second cabinet suffered defeat in a parliamentary vote of no confidence, 101–96, in the 200-seat lower house. Prime minister Topolánek stated that he would resign. It happened in May, 2009.

Members of the Cabinet

Vote of No Confidence 

A vote of no confidence in the government was held on 24 March 2009. It was the first time since the dissolution of Czechoslovakia that Czech government had lost a vote of No Confidence. Vote was held during Czech Presidency of the Council of the European Union in 2009.

101 MPs voted for the motion of No Confidence. Some MPs from the governing coalition voted for the motion, including Vlastimil Tlustý, Jan Schwippel, Věra Jakubková and Olga Zubová. cabinet of Jan Fischer was appointed in May 2009.

Notes 

Czech government cabinets
Civic Democratic Party (Czech Republic)
KDU-ČSL
Green Party (Czech Republic)
Mirek Topolánek
Coalition governments of the Czech Republic